Viscount Castlemaine is a title that has been created three times in the Peerage of Ireland. The first creation came in 1628.  For more information on this creation, see Viscount Monson of Castlemaine.  The second creation came in 1718. For more information on this creation, see Earl Tylney. The third creation came in 1822. for more information on this creation, see Baron Castlemaine.

Viscounts Castlemaine (1718 creation)
see Earl Tylney

Viscounts Castlemaine (1822 creation)
see Baron Castlemaine

See also
Earl of Castlemaine

References

Extinct viscountcies in the Peerage of Ireland
Noble titles created in 1718
Noble titles created in 1822
Noble titles created for UK MPs
1718 establishments in Ireland